Olagadam is a panchayat town in Erode district in the Indian state of Tamil Nadu. The name originated from 'Ulagavidangam', meaning world's self-emerging (actually a Shiva temple 'Ulageshwarar' in which the Shiva lingam is said to be self emerged).

Demographics
 India census, Olagadam had a population of 9381. Males constitute 51% of the population and females 49%. Olagadam has an average literacy rate of 53%, lower than the national average of 59.5%: male literacy is 65%, and female literacy is 41%. In Olagadam, 9% of the population is under 6 years of age . The freedom fighter and poet MuthuKrishnanan Reddiar was born in this Village,  Further Freedom India's Contemporary legal Luminary Thiru Arunagiri Yuvaraj was born in this village during 1976 .Prominent Psychiatric nurse Mr.Srinivasan was born and  brought up in kulalar street.

References

Cities and towns in Erode district